Voice of Silence is a 2013 Iranian film written and directed by Mohammad Hadi Naeiji. The movie has won the Crystal Simorgh for Best Screenplay at the 32nd Fajr Film Festival. It was produced by the award-winning writer and director Reza Mirkarimi the director of A Cube of Sugar.

Plot 
Mir-Hashem is a young cleric whose wife has left him because of his angry creditors and his fertility problems. One of the creditors persuades Mir-Hashem to go for propagation and get the money from people.

Cast 
 Hesam Mahmoudi as Mir-Hashem
 Mohammad Asgari as the Creditor
 Houtan Shakiba as Sed-Hasan
 Shirin Esmaeeli as Fereshte
 Mahdi Farizeh as Ahmad

References

External links 
 Voice of Silence official website

Crystal Simorgh recipients
2013 films
2013 drama films
2010s Persian-language films
Iranian drama films